Georges Lamia (14 March 1933 – 10 March 2014) was a French former football goalkeeper. He played for France at the Euro 1960. He died on 10 March 2014 from natural causes just 4 days before his 81st birthday.

References

External links
 
 
 Biography 

1933 births
2014 deaths
People from El Taref Province
People of French Algeria
Association football goalkeepers
France international footballers
French footballers
Pieds-Noirs
Ligue 1 players
OGC Nice players
Stade Rennais F.C. players
1960 European Nations' Cup players